Joyce Dalton (20 May 1933 – 16 December 2016) was an Australian cricketer.
Dalton played three tests for the Australia national women's cricket team in 1958.

Dalton played for New South Wales in domestic cricket, save for a period when she was resident in New Zealand where she played for Canterbury and Wellington

Dalton was born in Gayndah, Queensland. She died in 2016, aged 83.

References

1933 births
2016 deaths
Australia women Test cricketers
Canterbury Magicians cricketers
New South Wales Breakers cricketers
Wellington Blaze cricketers